Didrik Knudsen Fløtre (born 31 December 1991) is a Norwegian former professional footballer who played as a striker. During his career, he won the Norwegian Football Cup twice with Aalesunds FK, in 2009 and 2011.

Club career
Fløtre began playing football with Tippeligaen side Aalesunds FK (AaFK). He made his debut on 4 June 2008 when he scored the winning goal on the 113th minute of AaFK's 5–4 victory against Åsane in the Norwegian Football Cup. He later won the Cup with AaFK in 2009 and 2011. In December 2009, he signed a four-year contract with AaFK.

After failing to break through into the starting lineup, he was loaned to Kristiansund in March 2012. For the season, he scored 13 goals in 24 league matches for Kristiansund, including five goals in a 6–1 win against Buvik IL on 13 May.

Fløtre later played for Brattvåg from 2014 to 2017 and Emblem from 2018 to 2019.

International career
Fløtre played seven matches for Norway's youth national teams.

Career statistics

References

External links
 Guardian Football 

1989 births
Living people
Aalesunds FK players
Association football forwards
Brattvåg IL players
Eliteserien players
Kristiansund BK players
Norway youth international footballers
Norwegian footballers